Gratonite is a lead-arsenic sulfosalt mineral, with the chemical composition Pb9As4S15. Gratonite was discovered in 1939 at the Excelsior Mine,  Cerro de Pasco, Peru. It is named in honor of geologist L. C. Graton (1880–1970), who had a long-standing association with the Cerro de Pasco mines.

References

Mineral Data Publishing
Webmineral
Mindat

Lead minerals
Arsenic minerals
Sulfide minerals
Trigonal minerals
Minerals in space group 160